Hugo Emanuel Larsson (born 27 June 2004) is a Swedish professional footballer who plays as a midfielder for Allsvenskan club Malmö FF.

Club career 
Born in Svarte, Larsson began his footballing career in SoGK Charlo before signing with Malmö FF as a 12-year-old. He made his senior debut for Malmö FF on 20 February 2022 in a Svenska Cupen against GAIS, appearing as a late substitute in a 5–1 win. He made his Allsvenskan debut on 11 April 2022 in a 1–1 draw with IF Elfsborg, playing for 45 minutes.

International career 
Larsson has represented the Sweden U17 and U19 teams. He made his full international debut for Sweden on 9 January 2023, playing for 68 minutes in a friendly 2–0 win against Finland before being replaced by Omar Faraj.

Career statistics

Club

International

Honours 
Malmö FF

 Svenska Cupen: 2021–22

Individual
Allsvenskan Young Player of the Year: 2022

References

External links

2004 births
Living people
Swedish footballers
Sweden international footballers
Sweden youth international footballers
Allsvenskan players
Association football midfielders
Malmö FF players